Diesel engine runaway is a rare condition affecting diesel engines, in which the engine draws extra fuel from an unintended source and overspeeds at higher and higher RPM, producing up to ten times the engine's rated output until destroyed by mechanical failure or bearing seizure due to a lack of lubrication. Hot-bulb engines and jet engines can also run away via the same process.

Causes

In a diesel engine, the torque and the rotational speed are controlled by means of quality torque manipulation. This means that, with each intake stroke, the engine draws in air which is not mixed with fuel; the fuel is injected into the cylinder after its contents have been compressed during the compression stroke. The high air temperature near the end of the compression stroke causes spontaneous combustion of the mixture as the fuel is injected. The output torque is controlled by adjusting the mass of injected fuel; the more fuel injected, the higher the torque produced. Adjusting the amount of fuel received per stroke alters the quality of the air-fuel-mixture, and adjusting the amount of the mixture itself is not required which is why diesel engines do not have throttle valves.

Diesel engines can combust a large variety of fuels, including many sorts of oil, petrol, and combustible gasses. This means that if there is any type of leak or malfunction that increases the amount of oil or fuel unintentionally entering the combustion chamber, the quality of the air-fuel-mixture will increase, causing torque and rotational speed to increase.

Fuel and oil leaks causing engine runaways can have both internal and external causes. Broken seals or a broken turbocharger may cause large amounts of oil mist to enter the inlet manifold, whereas defective injection pumps may cause an unintentionally large amount of fuel to be injected directly into the combustion chamber. If a diesel engine is operated in an environment where combustible gases are used, a gas leak may result in an engine runaway if the gas can enter the engine's inlet manifold.

Stopping a runaway engine 
Several ways to stop a runaway diesel engine are to block off the air intake, either physically using a cover or plug, or alternatively by directing a  fire extinguisher into the air intake to smother the engine. Engines fitted with a decompressor can also be stopped by operating the decompressor, and in a vehicle with a manual transmission it is sometimes possible to stop the engine by engaging a high gear (i.e. 4th, 5th, 6th etc.), with foot brake and parking brake fully applied, and quickly letting out the clutch to slow the engine RPM to a stop, without moving the vehicle. This should be the last option because it can result in catastrophic damage to the whole transmission, mainly the gearbox, but this operation can save the engine.

Notable incidents involving diesel engine runaway
In the Texas City Refinery explosion, an instance of diesel engine runaway is thought to have provided the ignition source that triggered the massive explosion. After the refinery's blowdown stack failed and started releasing raffinate into the air, a pickup truck that had been parked near the blowdown stack with its engine idling was engulfed by the vapor cloud released and the engine began to race. As staff at the refinery attempted to stop the truck's now-overheating engine, it backfired, igniting the vapor cloud and triggering the disaster.

References

Bibliography

See also
 Rev limiter

External links
 A General Electric ES44AC locomotive in the process of a runaway
 Norfolk Southern diesel locomotive in runaway

Engine problems
Diesel engines